De Lalande may refer to:

 De Lalande (crater), an impact crater on Venus, named for the astronomer
 Hôtel de Lalande, now Musée des Arts Décoratifs et du Design in Bordeaux, France

People with the surname
 Antoine André de Sainte-Marthe de Lalande, chevalier de Sainte-Marthe (1615–1679), French soldier 
 Jean de Lalande (died 1646), French Jesuit missionary
 Joseph de Lalande or Jérôme Lalande (1732–1807), French astronomer and writer
 Marie-Jeanne de Lalande (1768–1832), French astronomer and mathematician
 Michel Lefrançois de Lalande (1766–1839), French astronomer
 Michel-Richard de Lalande (1657–1726), French Baroque composer and organist

See also
 Château de Lalande (disambiguation)
 
 Delalande, a surname
 Lalande (disambiguation)